The Star Awards for YES 933 Best Speech was an award presented annually at the Star Awards, a ceremony that was established in 1994. It is presented by YES 933, a Mediacorp radio station since 1990.

The category was introduced in 2011, at the 17th Star Awards ceremony; Qi Yuwu received the award and it is given in honour of a Mediacorp artiste who has delivered an outstanding speech in the Star Awards. The winners are selected by a majority vote from a team of judges employed by Mediacorp. 

Since its inception, the award was given to six artistes. Elvin Ng is the most recent winner in this category.

Recipients

 Each year is linked to the article about the Star Awards held that year.

References

External links 

Star Awards